Nick Santora (born 1970) is a writer and producer born in Queens, New York. He won the Best Screenplay of the Competition in the New York City Independent International Film Festival. He has also written and/or produced The Sopranos, The Guardian, Law & Order, Prison Break, Lie to Me, Scorpion and he created and executive produced Beauty and the Geek. Nick also co-wrote/created/executive produced the television series Breakout Kings. He served as executive producer and developer of Scorpion from 2014 to 2018 with 4 seasons.

Career
Santora graduated from Columbia Law School and practiced law for six years before giving up a full-time practice to write and produce television.

Nick also wrote and produced The Longshots, a film starring Ice Cube and Keke Palmer, and was a credited writer on the Lionsgate/Marvel Studios film Punisher: War Zone.

Other work
Santora's first novel, Slip & Fall, was selected by Borders Books Stores to be the debut novel for their newly created publishing division. It was a National Best Seller.
His second novel, Fifteen Digits, was published in 2012 by Little Brown's suspense/thriller imprint, Mulholland Books.

Filmography 
Film
The Longshots (2008) 
Punisher: War Zone (2008) 
Safety (2020) 
Dog Gone (2023)

TV

References

External links
 

1970 births
Living people
American male screenwriters
Screenwriters from New York (state)
American soap opera writers
Television producers from New York City
Columbia Law School alumni
New York (state) lawyers
People from Queens, New York
American male television writers
Showrunners